Rachael D. Fields (born March 19, 1980) is an American politician. A member of the Democratic Party, she has served in the Vermont House of Representatives since being first elected in 2014.

Electoral history

References

External links
 Representative Rachael Fields
 Profile at Vote Smart

Living people
1980 births
People from Bennington, Vermont
Politicians from Tempe, Arizona
Democratic Party members of the Vermont House of Representatives
Women state legislators in Vermont
21st-century American politicians
21st-century American women politicians